Charles Hannawalt (January 15, 1910 in Los Angeles, California – June 7, 1973 in Los Angeles, California) was an American key grip, film producer, and cinematographer.  He worked in the film industry from 1956 to 1971, most frequently as a key grip for low-budget films directed and/or produced by Roger Corman and released by American International Pictures.  He is probably best known as the cinematographer for Francis Ford Coppola's Dementia 13, the only film in which he worked in that capacity.  He also produced a handful of exploitation films.

External links
 

1910 births
1973 deaths
American cinematographers
American film producers